Agios Ioannis Pafou (or ) is a small village in the Paphos District of Cyprus, located  north of Salamiou. Prior to 1974, the village was inhabited almost exclusively by Turkish Cypriots.

References

Communities in Paphos District